Niranjan Bishi is an Indian politician and a member of the Rajya Sabha, upper house of the Parliament of India from Odisha as member of the Biju Janata Dal.

References

Biju Janata Dal politicians
Living people
Year of birth missing (living people)